Echoes: The Best of Pink Floyd is the fourth compilation album by the English rock band Pink Floyd,  released on 5 November 2001 by EMI internationally and a day later by Capitol Records in the United States. It debuted at No. 2 on the Billboard 200 album chart on 24 November 2001, with sales of 214,650 copies. It remained on the chart for 26 weeks. The album was certified gold, platinum and double platinum on 6 December 2001 in the US by the RIAA. It was certified triple platinum in the US on 8 January 2002, and quadruple platinum on 10 September 2007.

Contents
The compilation spans the career of Pink Floyd from their first single "Arnold Layne" in 1967, through to "High Hopes", the final track from their 1994 studio album The Division Bell. Original frontman Syd Barrett is featured on six of the album's 26 tracks, providing lead vocals on five. Four of the band's albums—More, Ummagumma, Atom Heart Mother and Obscured by Clouds—are not represented, though multiple tracks from Atom Heart Mother and Ummagumma were planned to appear on the compilation. Each of the 26 tracks fades from one to the next with no break in the music, courtesy of longtime producer/engineer James Guthrie, to help recreate the concept album feel of the band's mid-period work. All 26 tracks were newly remastered specifically for this compilation and are not sequenced in chronological order.

The band's longtime guitarist, David Gilmour, said of the process of compiling the tracks themselves:

Roger Waters's main contribution was the name of the compilation. "I had to, because the name the boys came up with was so awful. What was it? 'Sum of the Parts'. See what I mean?"

Cover

Storm Thorgerson, who had done the majority of album covers for Pink Floyd, did the Echoes art which features recursive windows in an infinite regression as a nod to his own cover for 1969's Ummagumma, and the objects on each landscape refer to the Pink Floyd discography. For instance, the man on fire from Wish You Were Here, another wearing the Delicate Sound of Thunder lightbulb suit, dolls of the Atom Heart Mother cow and the Animals pig, a bike and both a brick wall and the hammers from The Wall. Eventually Thorgerson opted to make two images, with another used for the back cover. To create the idea on a photograph, various walls—which had varied measurements and angles to ensure that "nothing seemed to fit other than by eye through the lens."—were built and put in a country landscape in Sussex. Actors, props and fittings were set in and between those walls. The original design was one of two sketches submitted for Dream Theater's 1997 album Falling into Infinity, with the original being framed and hanging in the home of former Dream Theater drummer Mike Portnoy and is pointed out by Portnoy in his Hudson Music instructional drum DVD In Constant Motion.

Release

Echoes is Floyd's first album to include "When the Tigers Broke Free", from the film version of The Wall (the song reappeared on a 2004 rerelease of The Final Cut in a slightly remixed form). It was their first compilation to include songs from The Final Cut, A Momentary Lapse of Reason and The Division Bell and is the only one to include "Echoes", from 1971's Meddle.

With first-week sales of 215,000—beating their previous first-week peak of 198,000 for Pulse—the album hit number two on the Billboard 200, behind Britney Spears' Britney (746,000). In 2001 the album was the 16th best-selling album globally, selling 4.8 million copies.

A week after the band's one-off reunion at Live 8 in 2005, HMV said sales of Echoes rose by 1343%.

Track listing

CD version

Disc one

Disc two

Vinyl version

Rejected songs
According to James Guthrie, the following songs were considered for inclusion:
"Interstellar Overdrive" (Barrett, Waters, Wright, Mason) The Piper at the Gates of Dawn, 1967 
"The Scarecrow" (Barrett) The Piper at the Gates of Dawn, 1967
"Chapter 24" (Barrett) The Piper at the Gates of Dawn, 1967
"Careful with That Axe, Eugene" (Waters, Wright, Gilmour, Mason) B-side of "Point Me at the Sky", 1968; also appears on Relics 
"Grantchester Meadows" (Waters) Ummagumma, 1969
An edited version of "Atom Heart Mother" (Waters, Wright, Gilmour, Mason, Geesin) Atom Heart Mother, 1970
"If" (Waters) Atom Heart Mother, 1970
"Fat Old Sun" (Gilmour) Atom Heart Mother, 1970
"Fearless" (Gilmour, Waters) Meddle, 1971
"San Tropez" (Waters) Meddle, 1971
"Breathe" (Waters, Gilmour, Wright) The Dark Side of the Moon, 1973
"Brain Damage" (Waters) The Dark Side of the Moon, 1973
"Eclipse" (Waters) The Dark Side of the Moon, 1973
"Dogs" (Waters, Gilmour) Animals, 1977
"Mother" (Waters) The Wall, 1979
"Young Lust" (Waters, Gilmour) The Wall, 1979
"Nobody Home" (Waters) The Wall, 1979
"Your Possible Pasts" (Waters) The Final Cut, 1983
"The Gunner's Dream" (Waters) The Final Cut, 1983
"Paranoid Eyes" (Waters) The Final Cut, 1983

Personnel
Pink Floyd
Syd Barrett – guitar and lead vocals on "Astronomy Domine", "See Emily Play", "Arnold Layne", "Jugband Blues" and "Bike", guitar on "Set the Controls for the Heart of the Sun"
Roger Waters – bass, rhythm guitar on "Sheep", tape effects, lead vocals on "The Happiest Days of Our Lives", "Another Brick in the Wall, Part II", "Hey You", "Set the Controls for the Heart of the Sun", "Sheep", "Shine on You Crazy Diamond", "Comfortably Numb", "The Fletcher Memorial Home", "When the Tigers Broke Free", backing vocals
David Gilmour – guitars, fretless bass guitar on "Hey You", bass guitar on "Sheep", "High Hopes", and "One Of These Days", keyboards, drum programming on "Sorrow", lead vocals on "Another Brick in the Wall, Part II", "Echoes", "Hey You", "Money", "Keep Talking", "Sorrow", "Time", "Comfortably Numb", "Us and Them", "Learning to Fly", "Wish You Were Here", "High Hopes", backing vocals
Richard Wright – keyboards, Hammond organ, piano, synthesizers, clavinet, co-lead vocals on "Astronomy Domine", "Echoes", "Time", "Us and Them", backing vocals
Nick Mason – drums, percussion, tape effects, vocalisations on "One of These Days"

Additional personnel
Sam Brown – backing vocals on "Keep Talking"
Jon Carin – additional keyboards on "Marooned" and "Keep Talking", keyboards on "Learning to Fly" and piano on "High Hopes"
Lesley Duncan – backing vocals on "Time" and "Us and Them"
Venetta Fields – backing vocals on "Shine On You Crazy Diamond"
Donnie Gerard – backing vocals on "Sorrow" and "Learning to Fly"
James Guthrie – percussion on "The Happiest Days of Our Lives"
Doug Sax, James Guthrie, Joel Plante – remastering at The Mastering Lab
Robert Hadley – transfers
Islington Green School – choir on "Another Brick in the Wall (Part 2)"
Michael Kamen – orchestrations
Carol Kenyon – backing vocals on "Keep Talking"
Darlene Koldenhoven – backing vocals on "Sorrow" and "Learning to Fly"
Tony Levin – bass guitar on "Learning to Fly"
Durga McBroom – backing vocals on "Keep Talking"
Dick Parry – saxophones on "Money", "Us and Them", and "Shine On You Crazy Diamond"
Pontarddulais Male Voice Choir led by Noel Davis – choir on "When the Tigers Broke Free"
Guy Pratt – bass on "Marooned" and "Keep Talking"
The Salvation Army (The International Staff Band) on "Jugband Blues":
Ray Bowes (cornet)
Terry Camsey (cornet)
Mac Carter (trombone)
Les Condon (E♭ bass)
Maurice Cooper (euphonium)
Ian Hankey (trombone)
George Whittingham (B♭ bass)
One other uncredited musician
Phyllis St. James – backing vocals on "Sorrow" and "Learning to Fly"
Barry St. John – backing vocals on "Time" and "Us and Them"
Liza Strike – backing vocals on "Time" and "Us and Them"
Storm Thorgerson – cover design
Clare Torry – vocals on "The Great Gig in the Sky"
Doris Troy – backing vocals on "Time" and "Us and Them"
Carmen Twillie – backing vocals on "Sorrow" and "Learning to Fly"
Gary Wallis – percussion on "Keep Talking"
Carlena Williams – backing vocals on "Shine On You Crazy Diamond"

Charts

Weekly charts

Year-end charts

Certifications and sales

References

External links
Album's official website

2001 greatest hits albums
Albums produced by David Gilmour
Albums produced by James Guthrie (record producer)
Albums produced by Joe Boyd
Albums produced by Nick Mason
Albums produced by Richard Wright (musician)
Albums produced by Roger Waters
Albums with cover art by Storm Thorgerson
Pink Floyd compilation albums
Capitol Records compilation albums
EMI Records compilation albums
Albums recorded at Studio Miraval
Albums recorded at CBS 30th Street Studio
Albums recorded at A&M Studios
Albums recorded at RAK Studios
Albums recorded at Morgan Sound Studios